Below are the full rosters and coaching staff of the 16 teams of Minor League Baseball's Florida Complex League.

Florida Complex League Astros Blue

Florida Complex League Astros Orange

Florida Complex League Blue Jays

Florida Complex League Braves

Florida Complex League Cardinals

Florida Complex League Marlins

Florida Complex League Mets

Florida Complex League Nationals

Florida Complex League Orioles

Florida Complex League Phillies

Florida Complex League Pirates

Florida Complex League Rays

Florida Complex League Red Sox

Florida Complex League Tigers

Florida Complex League Twins

Florida Complex League Yankees

See also
List of Arizona Complex League team rosters

Florida Complex League
Rosters